A Firing Offense is a 1992 crime novel and the debut from author George Pelecanos. It is set in Washington, D.C. and focuses on marketing executive Nick Stefanos as he investigates the disappearance of a colleague. It is the first of several Pelecanos novels to feature the character and the first of a trilogy with Stefanos as the main character. The other books in this series are Nick's Trip and Down by the River Where the Dead Men Go.

Plot introduction
Nick Stefanos is a marketing executive for electrical goods chain Nutty Nathan's. When a stock boy from the company disappears he is convinced to locate the boy by his grandfather.

Explanation of the novel's title
Stefanos is fired from his job at Nutty Nathan's but the reason for his dismissal does not become clear until the end of the book.

Characters
Nick Stefanos is a marketing executive and one time process server. He works for a chain of electrical goods stores. He was once a floor salesman. He remains friends with his old sales colleague Johnny McGinnes. Both Stefanos and McGinnes drink heavily and abuse recreational drugs.

Major themes 
The novel is concerned with substance abuse both by the main characters and facilitated by the drug distributors.

Literary significance and reception 
The novel was positively compared to Charles Willeford and Daniel Woodrell by a reviewer. The reviewer commented that the plot was perfunctory and that the novel was more concerned with examining the lives of the salesmen. He praised the book for drawing such interest from a seemingly mundane profession. The reviewer commented on Pelecanos frequent use of music references.

The series as a whole has been described as tightly plotted with "intricacies to rival Hammett or Chandler".

Footnotes 

1992 American novels
Novels by George Pelecanos
Novels set in Washington, D.C.